Unisport Football Club de Bafang is a football club based in Bafang in Cameroon's West Province. They are a member of the Cameroonian Football Federation and play in the Cameroon Premiere Division. The club's colours are yellow and red.

Honours
 Cameroon Première Division: 1
 1996

 Cameroon Cup: 1
 2012
Runners-up: 2000, 2005, 2011

Super Coupe Roger Milla: 0

Performance in CAF competitions
CAF Champions League: 1 appearance
1997 - Second Round

CAF Confederation Cup: 3 appearances
2012 - First Round
2013 - Preliminary Round
2015 - Preliminary Round

Current squad
as of 17 June 2019
Head coach Pierre Ndjili Ndengue
Assistant coach Roger Tcheuko
Team chef Marcellin Gaha Djiadeu

Notes

Football clubs in Cameroon
1959 establishments in French Cameroon
Association football clubs established in 1959
West Region (Cameroon)